The Association of Optometrists (AOP) is the leading representative membership organisation for optometrists in the United Kingdom.

It supports over 82% of practising optometrists (members) to fulfil their professional roles to protect the nation’s eye health.

Activities and services 
The Association provides a range of professional services and products to its members, including:

 Indemnity insurance
 Legal representation and advice
 Continuing education and training (CET)
 Annual conferences, events and webinars
 News, online and print, under the brand title Optometry Today
 Political lobbying

History 
The organisation traces its history back to 1946. when the Institute of Ophthalmic Opticians (formed in 1904) and the Joint Council of Qualified Opticians (founded in 1923), were incorporated into The Association of Optical Practitioners.

In 1986, the organisation renamed to the Association of Optometrists. The organisation retains use of the 'AOP' acronym.

In 2017 the organisation reported it had grown to "17,000+ members", "representing 80% of UK optometrists".

Publishing 
The organisation publishes a professional journal, Optometry Today.

See also
 European Academy of Optometry and Optics
 World Council of Optometry
 American Optometric Association
 American Academy of Optometry

References

External links
 
 Optometry Today

Eye care in the United Kingdom
Health in the London Borough of Islington
Medical associations based in the United Kingdom
Organisations based in the London Borough of Islington